Gio (born Sergio Bermejo Romero, 6 April 1990) is a Spanish singer, actor, songwriter and producer.
He started his career singing gospel music in different choirs from Madrid. Earlier, he became a member of a mix band called D-ViNe, who were finalists in the TV show Salvemos Eurovision in 2008 to represent Spain in the Eurovision Song Contest 2008 with the song "I Do You". In 2008, he signed with AMZ Records after being seen on television by the director of the record company, but that didn't work. After working as an actor in different shows and writing and producing songs for other artists, Gio was a semifinalist on the TV Show Destino Eurovision 2011. In 2011 Gio released his first solo album Mentiras, Sexo y Gafas de Sol signed with Nat Team Media. In 2013 he became a finalist in the Spanish TV talent-show El Número Uno.

Discography

Albums

Singles

Other charted songs

Music videos

Filmography

Television

References

External links

[https://www.instagram.com/giobermejo
|Instagram]
[https://www.youtube.com/user/GiODTV
|Official YouTube Channel]

Living people
1990 births
Spanish male television actors
Singers from Madrid
Male actors from Madrid
Writers from Madrid
21st-century Spanish singers
21st-century Spanish male singers